The 2016–17 Sportfreunde Lotte season is their first season in the 3. Liga.

Events
Sportfreunde Lotte won promotion after beating SV Waldhof Mannheim in the 2015–16 Regionalliga promotion play-offs.

Transfers

In

Out

Preseason and friendlies

3. Liga

3. Liga fixtures & results

League table

Westphalian Cup

Westphalian Cup review

Westphalian Cup results

Player information
.

|}

Notes
A.   Kickoff time in Central European Time/Central European Summer Time.
B.   Sportfreunde Lotte goals first.

References

Sportfreunde Lotte seasons
Sportfreunde Lotte